Samuel "Sam" Guthrie (1885 – January 25, 1960) was a Scottish-born miner, farmer and political figure in British Columbia. He represented Newcastle from 1920 to 1924 as a Federated Labour member and Cowichan-Newcastle from 1933 to 1949 as a Co-operative Commonwealth Federation member in the Legislative Assembly of British Columbia.

He was born in East Kilbride, Lanarkshire and worked as a boy in the Scottish coal mines. Guthrie came to Canada in 1911 and settled on Vancouver Island south of Nanaimo. He was once again employed in the coal mines. He was jailed for two years following a long strike. After his release, Guthrie began farming. He was elected to the assembly in 1920 and then defeated in 1924, 1928 and 1933. After his retirement from politics, Guthrie lived in North Oyster. He died there at the age of 75.

References 

1885 births
1960 deaths
British Columbia Co-operative Commonwealth Federation MLAs
20th-century Canadian politicians